Alceste may refer to:

Literature
Alcestis (play), a 438 BC play by Euripides
Alceste, a character in The Legend of Good Women by Chaucer
Alceste, a character in Le Misanthrope by Molière

Operas
Alceste (Lully), a 1674 opera by Jean-Baptiste Lully
Alceste (Handel), a 1750 opera by George Frideric Handel
Alceste (Gluck), a 1767 opera by Christoph Willibald Gluck
Alceste (Schweitzer), a 1773 opera by Anton Schweitzer
Alceste (Strungk), a 1680 opera by Nicolaus Adam Strungk
Alceste, a 1768 opera by Pietro Alessandro Guglielmi
Alceste, a 1922 opera by Rutland Boughton

Other uses
Alcestis or Alceste, a princess in Greek mythology
Alceste (trilobite), a trilobite genus
HMS Alceste (1793), a 32-gun fifth rate captured from the French in 1793 and sold in 1802
HMS Alceste (1806), a 38-gun fifth rate captured in 1806 and wrecked in 1817

People with the given name
Alceste De Ambris, Italian socialist